Istoé (Portuguese for 'This is'; often stylized ISTOÉ or IstoÉ) is a weekly news magazine in Portuguese published in Brazil, roughly the equivalent of the American magazines Time or Newsweek.

History
The magazine was established in 1976. It is published weekly by Editora Três  on Saturdays. It is considered one of the three main magazines being published in the country, along with Veja and Época.

Circulation
In 2003 the circulation of Istoé was 362,307 copies.

References

External links
 Istoé website 

1976 establishments in Brazil
Magazines published in Brazil
Weekly magazines published in Brazil
Magazines established in 1976
News magazines published in South America
Portuguese-language magazines
Mass media in São Paulo